Fırat Aydınus (born 25 October 1973) is a former Turkish international football referee. He studied and practiced geophysical engineering. In January 2012, he was promoted from UEFA Category 1 to the Elite Development category.

He refereed at the 2014 FIFA World Cup qualifiers. Aydınus took charge at the UEFA Champions League group stage matches for the first time in September 2012.

References

External links 
 

1973 births
Living people
Sportspeople from Istanbul
Turkish football referees
UEFA Champions League referees
UEFA Europa League referees